Grigory Motovilov (born February 7, 1998) is a Russian professional basketball player for BC Enisey of the VTB United League. He played for PBC Lokomotiv Kuban of the VTB United League and the EuroCup, as well as the Russian national basketball team Motovilov signed with BC Izhevsk of the Russian Basketball Super League 1 on December 17, 2021.

National team career
Motovilov was a member of the Russian junior national teams. With Russia's junior national teams, he played at the 2013 FIBA Europe Under-16 Championship, the FIBA U18 European Championship, and the 2017 FIBA U20 European Championship where he averaged 18.4 points, 3 points and 2.8 rebounds.

Motovilov is a member of the senior Russian national basketball team, with Russia's senior men team, he played at the 2019 FIBA Basketball World Cup where he averaged 4.6 points, 1 rebounds and 1.2 assists.

References

External links
Eurobasket.com
 RealGM profile

1998 births
Living people
2019 FIBA Basketball World Cup players
Basketball players from Moscow
BC Spartak Primorye players
BC Zenit Saint Petersburg players
Competitors at the 2019 Summer Universiade
PBC Lokomotiv-Kuban players
Russian men's basketball players